Maicon is a Brazilian variant of the given name Michael. It may refer to:

Brazilian footballers
Maicon (footballer, born 1981), Maicon Douglas Sisenando, Brazilian football right-back
Maicon dos Santos (born 1981), Brazilian football midfielder
Maicon Santos (born 1984), Brazilian football forward
Maicon (footballer, born 1985), Maicon Thiago Pereira de Souza, Brazilian football midfielder
Maicon (footballer, born May 1988) (1988–2014), Maicon Pereira de Oliveira, Brazilian football striker
Maicon (footballer, born September 1988), Maicon Pereira Roque, Brazilian football centre-back
Maicon Souza (footballer) (born 1989), Brazilian football midfielder
Maicon (footballer, born 1990), Maicon Marques Bitencourt, Brazilian football winger
Maicon (footballer, born 1993), Maicon da Silva Moreira, Brazilian football wingback

Other people
Maicon, half of Brazilian Música sertaneja duo ; see Latin Grammy Award for Best Sertaneja Music Album

See also
Maycon

Portuguese masculine given names